Dichomeris alphito is a moth in the family Gelechiidae. It was described by Ronald W. Hodges in 1986. It is found in North America, where it has been recorded from the Santa Rita Mountains in Arizona and California.

References

Moths described in 1986
alphito